Steve Thonn (pronounced TUN) is an American football coach. He was previously was a head coach in the Arena Football League (AFL) for the Houston Thunderbears, Grand Rapids Rampage and Cleveland Gladiators. Thonn is also a former AFL player. He played WR/DB for the Chicago Bruisers (1988) and the Albany Firebirds (1990–1993). He was the offensive coordinator of the Georgia Force from 2004 to 2007 before being hired as the Rampage head coach.

College years
Thonn attended Wheaton College and was a student and a letterman in football, basketball, and baseball. In football, he was named as a Division III All-America selection as a senior.

Playing career

Chicago Bruisers
Thonn played with the Chicago Bruisers of the Arena Football League in 1988, after going undrafted. Thonn played both wide receiver and defensive back in the ironman league. Thonn's play helped the Bruisers reach ArenaBowl II, where they lost to the Detroit Drive.

Albany Firebirds
Thonn played the 1990 through 1993 seasons with the Albany Firebirds.

Stats

Coaching career

Cleveland Gladiators
Thonn was hired by the Cleveland Gladiators on December 22, 2009 as their new head coach in time for the franchise to restart in the resurrected Arena Football League. His contract was not renewed at the end of the 2016 season.

Head coaching record

References

External links
arenafan.com player page
arenafan.com coach page

Year of birth missing (living people)
Living people
Sportspeople from Wheaton, Illinois
American football wide receivers
American football defensive backs
Chicago Bruisers players
Albany Firebirds players
Grand Rapids Rampage coaches
Cleveland Gladiators coaches
Wheaton Thunder football players
Wheaton Thunder men's basketball players
Washington Valor coaches
Georgia Force coaches
Houston Thunderbears coaches
Connecticut Coyotes coaches
Indiana Firebirds coaches
American men's basketball players